Rasen  may refer to:

 Rasen (novel) or Spiral, a 1995 Japanese novel by Koji Suzuki
 Rasen (film) or Spiral, a 1998 Japanese film based on the novel
 Rasen (TV series), a 1999 Japanese TV drama based on the novel